
The following is a list of the oldest schools in Sri Lanka that are still functioning.

See also 
 List of the oldest schools in the world
 List of schools in Sri Lanka

Footnotes

Notes

References 

 

Sri Lanka
Sri Lanka
 Oldest schools
History of education in Sri Lanka
Sri Lanka